Munster Technological University (MTU) is a public technological university consisting of six campuses located in Cork and Kerry. The university was established in January 2021, the result of a merger between two institutes of technology, Cork Institute of Technology and the Institute of Technology, Tralee. Its creation was announced in May 2020. It accommodates more than 18,000 students and over 2,000 members of staff.

It is Ireland's second technological university, after Technological University Dublin.

Facilities
Munster Technological University consists of six campuses, the Kerry campuses in Dromtacker and Clash, Tralee, and the Cork campuses in Bishopstown, Cork School of Music, and Crawford College of Art and Design, as well as the National Maritime College of Ireland facility in Ringaskiddy.

MTU Bishopstown Campus, Cork
The main Cork campus, of approximately eighty acres, is situated in Bishopstown in the western suburbs of Cork city. It has theatres, lecture rooms, laboratories, drawing studios, a library, computer suites, open access computing centre and research units. Recreational facilities for the expected student population include a running track, tennis courts, all-weather pitch, a gymnasium and grass playing pitches, while an indoor swimming pool is located nearby. This campus has won awards for its architectural design and aesthetics.

MTU Kerry North Campus, Dromtacker, Tralee

, IT Tralee had plans to grow the Dromtacker campus, so that the smaller Clash campus could be closed.

History
Early plans for a technical university in the region included a three-way merger with Waterford IT which was examined in 2012.

In building a proposal, the two institutions sought to offer a multi-campus institution spanning across Cork and Kerry, creating a second university in the region, and third in the province of Munster. A formal application for T.U. status was lodged in February 2019.

In May 2019, academic staff of Cork Institute of Technology and IT Tralee rejected the merger, and an international advisory panel visited the campuses.

In 2019, Cork Institute of Technology refused to take on IT Tralee's financial debts.

In May 2020, Taoiseach Leo Varadkar announced the formal approval of the technological university, to begin operations in January 2021. The merger was welcomed by industry body Ibec.

In October 2021, MTU launched the Code Red Period Dignity campaign to provide free period products to staff and students. It was the first university in Ireland to provide such a service. The campaign also ran a series of events, talks and workshops to tackle taboos and misinformation around menstruation.

See also 
 Munster Technological University ransomware attack

References

External links
 

 
2021 establishments in Ireland
Educational institutions established in 2021
Universities established in the 2020s
Education in Cork (city)
Education in County Kerry
Universities and colleges in the Republic of Ireland
Universities and colleges formed by merger in the Republic of Ireland
Technological universities in the Republic of Ireland